George Hermann Büchi (August 1, 1921 – August 28, 1998) was a Swiss organic chemist and professor at the Massachusetts Institute of Technology. "Paternò's reaction", known since the early twentieth century, was renamed to the "Paternò–Büchi reaction" based on enhancements made to it by Büchi's research group.

Büchi died at the age of 77 of heart failure while hiking with his wife in Switzerland.

References

1921 births
1998 deaths
Organic chemists
Massachusetts Institute of Technology faculty
Members of the United States National Academy of Sciences
Swiss expatriates in the United States